Zogby (زغبي) may refer to:

 IBOPE Zogby International, market research and polling company

People with the surname
 James Zogby (born 1945), American founder and president of the Arab American Institute and brother of John Zogby
 John Zogby (born 1948), American pollster, president & CEO of Zogby International and brother of James Zogby

See also 
 Zoghbi / Zoghby, a surname